Colombia was a Colombian UCI Professional Continental cycling team based in Adro (Italy) that participated in UCI Continental Circuits and UCI World Tour races.

History
In January 2012, it was announced that the team had received invites to the Italian classic races Tirreno–Adriatico, Milan–San Remo and Giro di Lombardia. They were invited to ride the 2013 Giro d'Italia. The team was also invited to the 2014 Giro d'Italia, where during the tenth stage of the race, members of the team wore a white cockade, in memory of the people who died in the Fundación bus fire in Colombia. In 2015 they were invited to the Vuelta a España for the first time. At 30 August it became clear that Cano, Qunitero and Ávila who all cycle for Team Colombia, was picked out for Colombia National Team at the 2015 UCI Road World Championships in Richmond, Virginia.

In October 2015, the team announced they would be disbanding and not returning for the 2016 season, citing shortfalls in sponsorship from the Colombian Sports Ministry.

Team roster

Major wins

2012
Stage 4 Giro del Trentino, Darwin Atapuma
Prologue Vuelta a Colombia, Fabio Duarte
Stage 5 Vuelta a Colombia, Juan Pablo Forero
Stage 5 Vuelta a Burgos, Esteban Chaves
Gran Premio Città di Camaiore, Esteban Chaves
Coppa Sabatini, Fabio Duarte
2013
Stage 6 Tour de Pologne, Darwin Atapuma
Stage 1 Tour de l'Ain, Leonardo Duque
Gran Premio Bruno Beghelli, Leonardo Duque
2014
Stage 1 Tour de Langkawi, Dúber Quintero
 Road Race Championships, Miguel Ángel Rubiano
Stage 2 Vuelta a Colombia, Jeffry Romero

National champions
2014
 Colombian Road Race Miguel Ángel Rubiano

References

External links
 

Cycling teams based in Colombia
Former UCI Professional Continental teams
Cycling teams established in 2012
Cycling teams disestablished in 2015
Defunct cycling teams based in Colombia